Kim Won-min (born 12 August 1987) is a South Korean footballer who plays as midfielder for Mokpo City FC in K3 League.

Career
He was selected by FC Anyang in 2013 K League draft.

References

External links 

1987 births
Living people
Association football midfielders
South Korean footballers
Goyang KB Kookmin Bank FC players
FC Anyang players
Korea National League players
K League 2 players
K3 League players
Konkuk University alumni